The chimpanzee or common chimpanzee is a species of great ape native to the forests and savannahs of tropical Africa.

Chimpanzee may also refer to:
Chimpanzee (film), a 2012 nature film
Chimpanzees, the two member species of the genus Pan
, in service 1917–19

See also

Chimp (disambiguation)
Pygmy chimpanzee or bonobo, an endangered species of great ape